The 76th Infantry Division (76-ya Pekhotnaya Diviziya) was an infantry formation of the Russian Imperial Army.

Organization
1st Brigade
301st Infantry Regiment
302nd Infantry Regiment
2nd Brigade
303rd Infantry Regiment
304th Infantry Regiment

References

Infantry divisions of the Russian Empire